Albert Öijermark (16 February 1900 — 9 July 1970) was a Swedish Olympic footballer. He made four appearances for Sweden national football team.

Honours

Club 

 Djurgårdens IF 
 Svenska Mästerskapet: 1920

References

Swedish footballers
Sweden international footballers
Olympic footballers of Sweden
Djurgårdens IF Fotboll players
Kalmar FF players
1900 births
1970 deaths
Association football midfielders
Footballers at the 1920 Summer Olympics